Igor Aleksandrovich Byrlov (born 10 July 1986) is a Russian former professional footballer.

Club career
He made his debut in the Russian Premier League in 2005 for FC Torpedo Moscow.

References

1986 births
Living people
People from Apsheronsky District
Russian footballers
Association football midfielders
FC Torpedo Moscow players
FC Chernomorets Novorossiysk players
Russian Premier League players
FC Tyumen players
FC SKA-Khabarovsk players
FC Oryol players
FC Jūrmala players
Russian expatriate footballers
Expatriate footballers in Latvia
Russian expatriate sportspeople in Latvia
FC Dynamo Stavropol players
FC Dynamo Bryansk players
FC Volga Ulyanovsk players
Sportspeople from Krasnodar Krai